Strategic Actions for a Just Economy (SAJE) is a non-profit economic justice organization that advocates for tenant rights, healthy housing, and equitable development.  It was founded in 1996 by Gilda Haas and Kent Wong and is currently led by Executive Director Cynthia Strathmann PhD.  SAJE organizes working class communities in South Central Los Angeles through leadership development programs, tenant rights clinics, and job readiness training.

Community Benefits Agreements 
As a founding convening organization of the United Neighbors in Defense Against Displacement Coalition (UNIDAD)--formerly known as the Coalition for a Responsible USC and the Figueroa Corridor Coalition for Economic Justice--SAJE has fought for the adoption community benefits agreements (CBA) that ensure new developments benefit existing working-class residents in impacted neighborhoods. These agreements have included provisions for affordable housing funding, local targeted hiring, low-income health clinics, and set asides for low and extremely-low income housing.

Notable projects with CBAs involving SAJE: 
 Staples Center/LA Live
 GH Palmer Lorenzo Project
 University of Southern California University Village
 Grand Metropolitan Development

Other Projects 
 Secured affordable housing and renovations to buildings owned by a slum lord in South Los Angeles
 Developed a pilot program to reduce high check cashing fees for welfare recipients with Washington Mutual Bank.
 Co-organized the Annual South Los Angeles Health and Human Rights Conference to address community health issues.

References

Non-profit organizations based in the United States